Gayatri Devi was an Indian politician and spouse of Charan Singh who served as Member of 7th Lok Sabha from Kairana Lok Sabha constituency and Member of 5th Uttar Pradesh Legislative Assembly from Iglas Assembly constituency. She was only first lady MLA from Mathura.

Personal life 
She was born in 5 December 1905 at Sonipat district, Haryana. She died in 10 May 2002 after a prolonged illness. She married Charan Singh, Prime Minister of India on 5 June 1925.

References 

Indian politicians
India MPs 1980–1984
1905 births
2002 deaths